The El Carrizal Dam (in Spanish, Embalse El Carrizal) is a dam on the upper-middle course of the Tunuyán River, in the center-north of the province of Mendoza, Argentina upstream from the city of Rivadavia.

The dam is used to regulate the flow of the Tunuyán River, which comes from glacial sources in the Andes, and to irrigate the otherwise arid region. The reservoir is a tourist attraction and is employed for fishing, windsurfing, sailing, etc., while its shores feature camping sites and other lodging facilities.

Notes

References
 Municipality of Rivadavia

External links

Energy infrastructure completed in 1979
Dams in Argentina
Hydroelectric power stations in Argentina
Buildings and structures in Mendoza Province